Terry Slater may refer to:

 Terry Slater (geographer), British geographer
 Terry Slater (ice hockey), Canadian ice hockey player and coach